Sir Robert Alexander Falconer  (10 February 1867 – 4 November 1943) was a Canadian academic and bible scholar.

Life
He was born in Charlottetown, Prince Edward Island, the eldest child of a Presbyterian minister and his wife. He attended high school in Port of Spain Trinidad while his father was posted there and won a scholarship to the University of Edinburgh in Scotland. He graduated MA in 1889 and then spent three years at the divinity school of the Free Church of Scotland.

Falconer was ordained in 1892 but never held a clerical position. He returned to Canada that year and took a lecturership in New Testament Greek and exegesis at the Presbyterian college in Halifax, Nova Scotia. He also began to publish articles in learned journals. In 1902 Falconer received a D.Litt. from Edinburgh University. In 1907 he became president of the University of Toronto. He steered a middle path, combining pure scholarship with practicality. Thus he introduced more vocational subjects, while also developing higher degree programmes. He sought to maximise the independence of the university, battling unsuccessfully to retain German faculty members in 1914. Nonetheless he was knighted in 1917 for his advocacy of wartime recruitment. Falconer believed in the need to increase public awareness of, and accessibility to, Canada's historical records. He was a long time member of The Champlain Society's Council, serving as its Vice-President (1909-1935) and President (1936-42).

Falconer wrote several books on current affairs, including The German Tragedy and its Meaning for Canada (1915), Idealism in National Character (1920) and The United States as a Neighbour (1926). He was an advocate of broad cooperation between the English speaking nations in international affairs, but was concerned to avoid American dominance of these relationships. Ill health obliged him to decline the principalship of the University of Edinburgh in 1929, and he retired in 1932. However he continued his scholarly work, producing Pastoral Epistles, his most notable work of religious scholarship in 1937.

Honours
 Fellow of the Royal Society of Canada (1916).
 Yale University, Honorary Doctorate (1922).
University of Alberta, Honorary Doctorate (1936).

Sources

References

External links
Robert Alexander Falconer archival papers held at the University of Toronto Archives and Records Management Services
 

1867 births
1943 deaths
Alumni of the University of Edinburgh
Canadian Calvinist and Reformed theologians
Canadian expatriates in the United Kingdom
Canadian Knights Commander of the Order of St Michael and St George
Canadian people of Scottish descent
Canadian philosophers
Fellows of the Royal Society of Canada
People from Charlottetown
Persons of National Historic Significance (Canada)
Presidents of the University of Toronto